Marije Brummel (born 19 March 1985) is a Dutch football coach and former defensive midfielder. She started playing top level football at SC Klarenbeek, continuing with SV Saestum and Be Quick '28 in the old Hoofdklasse; and FC twente, Heerenveen, PSV and PEC Zwolle in the women Eredivisie and BeNe League. After that she moved abroad to play in Cyprus, England and Norway. She also played European football with Saestum and Apollon.

She was a member of the Dutch national team from 2007 until 2012 when she lost her place, taking part in the 2009 European Championship.

In December 2020 at the end of the Norwegian football season she retired as a player, taking up a position as head coach of the Fana IL's women's team.

International goals
Scores and results list the Netherlands goal tally first.

References

1985 births
Living people
Sportspeople from Zwolle
Dutch women's footballers
Netherlands women's international footballers
Dutch expatriate sportspeople in Cyprus
Dutch expatriate sportspeople in Norway
Dutch expatriate sportspeople in England
Expatriate women's footballers in England
Expatriate women's footballers in Norway
Apollon Ladies F.C. players
Bristol Academy W.F.C. players
Women's Super League players
FC Twente (women) players
Eredivisie (women) players
SC Heerenveen (women) players
Toppserien players
SK Brann Kvinner players
Be Quick '28 players
Women's association football defenders
Women's association football midfielders
Dutch expatriate women's footballers
SV Saestum players
Expatriate women's footballers in Cyprus
Footballers from Overijssel